East Saddle River Road is a north–south road from Ridgewood, New Jersey to Monsey, New York.

It is part of the following routes:
County Route 75 (Bergen County, New Jersey)
County Route 73 (Rockland County, New York)

Transportation in Bergen County, New Jersey
Streets in Bergen County, New Jersey